This article contains the rank insignia of the Hellenic Army (until 1973).

Officers

Other ranks

Royal Guard insignia 
Royal Guard (Evzones) insignia during Paul's reign

See also 
 Hellenic Army officer rank insignia
 Hellenic Army Other Ranks rank insignia
 Ranks and insignia of NATO Armies
 Comparative military ranks of World War I
 Comparative military ranks of World War II
 Comparative military ranks

Notes

References 

Military insignia
Military ranks of Greece